Tetteh Quarshie Memorial Hospital is a public Hospital located in Mampong Akuapem in the Eastern Region of Ghana.

History and Etymology
The hospital was established in 19?? and named to honour Tetteh Quarshie.

Site and Facilities
The road entrance is on the south side of the N4 highway, approximately one hour northeast of Accra.  The site is approximately seven hectares, pleasantly landscaped.  The hospital has an administrative building, a residential hostel for staff, three buildings containing patient wards, and several accessory buildings.

Medical Superintendents
2016-present Dr. Albert Benneh
20??-2016 Dr. Mawuli Gyakobo

See also
Akuapim-Mampong
Tetteh Quarshie

References

Hospitals in Ghana